The Ying'en Bridge, also known as Caishi Bridge, is a historic stone arch bridge over the Grand Canal in Yuecheng District, Shaoxing, Zhejiang, China.

History
The bridge was built in an unknown age and rebuilt in 1626 during the Tianqi era of the Ming dynasty (1368–1644). There are 12 stone posts supporting the railings, at the top of the railing posts stand carved 12 stone lions in different moods and postures.

In May 2013, it was listed among the seventh batch of "Major National Historical and Cultural Sites in Zhejiang" by the State Council of China.

Gallery

References

Bridges in Zhejiang
Arch bridges in China
Bridges completed in 1626
Ming dynasty architecture
Buildings and structures completed in 1626
1626 establishments in China
Major National Historical and Cultural Sites in Zhejiang